Supermodifieds are a class of open wheel race car that compete on paved short tracks throughout the United States of America and Canada.  The class was founded in the 1950s and is especially popular in the Western states, the Northeast and Great Lakes regions.

Design
Supermodifieds are generally constructed from aircraft-quality .095 thick chromium-molybdenum ("chromoly") frame tubing with steel and aluminum components.  The bodies are fabricated from fiberglass and aluminum.  The cars are powered by American fuel-injected V8 engines that run on methanol fuel and can produce in excess of 800 horsepower. At a weight of around 1,850 pounds the cars achieve an enormous power-to-weight ratio. Big block V8 engines are also sanctioned and are primarily raced on the west coast, with nearly all competitors choose to run aluminum small blocks ranging from 410 to 430 cu. in., whereas the cars of the east run the mandatory cast iron big block with aluminum heads bored to the allowable maximum displacement of 468 cu. in.  Cars in the midwest can run small blocks up to 412 cu. in. or big blocks up to 481 cu. in.

Modern era supermodifieds run a radical offset chassis that is up to 18 in. to the left of center. The engine and driveline components themselves are mounted in a specially-fabricated area placed outside the left side frame rails. The engine is thus a stressed member of the chassis. This allows weight distribution to favor the left side (often as much as 70%) and thereby aid cornering around the left-hand turns of an oval track.  The giant wings, (generally ' max),  mounted on the roll cage of the cars bear a resemblance to those found on sprint cars and serve a similar purpose, designed to produce down force and allow them to make tight turns at high speed.  The west coast style cars of ERA and SMRA run a fixed wing, whereas the cars of the east generally run a wing mounted to the suspension or chassis by pneumatic struts.  The racing slick tires used on a supermodified are among the widest used in pavement oval racing.

Like sprint cars, supermodifieds do not have starters, batteries, or transmissions and are push-started.

Sanctioning bodies

ISMA
The largest of the four is the Liverpool, New York-based International Supermodified Association (ISMA). Founded in 1974 by multi-time Oswego Speedway champions Jim Shampine and Nolan Swift to ensure the future of supermodified racing. With the help of local businessman, Tom Heveron, they formed ISMA as a forum for owners and drivers to express their ideas and opinions as they felt that they were not allowed to do so under the management of Oswego Speedway.

The goals were to upgrade supermodified racing with better safety conditions, more events per season to insure sufficient purses and to aid drivers with their race related problems. The association worked with track managements in making decisions and in discussing ways of improvement. The club encouraged new drivers and owners interested other tracks in supermodified racing and helped to make the division stronger and more well known to a wider audience.

Tom Heveron as president, with the help of Vice President, Jim Shampine and Secretary/Treasurer Fred Graves, led ISMA through its developmental stages. ISMA negotiated with Lancaster for a 40 lap race held on July 3, 1974, which Todd Gibson of Richwood, OH won. The following year ISMA booked races at Fulton Speedway with a $5,000 purse and $1,000 to win.

Starting in 1976, ISMA developed a point fund with tracks contributing $500– $1,000 per race to this fund. Unlike most other point systems, ISMA awards points to the car owners as ISMA is an owners club rather than drivers. Joining the Heveron, Shampine and Graves team, Shirley Letcher took over the responsibility for the point system. In just three seasons, ISMA had accomplished sanctioning over $96,000 in purse money and races, adding a point fund of $4,400 paid by promoters, having tow money at all of the ISMA sanctioned races, having insurance certificates from each promoter on file, and working with other promoters for more races in 1977. With races at Fulton (NY), Delaware (Ont. CAN), Star(NH), Flamboro(Ont. CAN), and Thompson(CT), Steve Gioia, Jr. became ISMA's first points Champion.

ISMA continues to be at the forefront of supermodified sanctioning bodies, pioneering the franchise system, in which teams purchase a franchise at the beginning of the season. Creating a win-win situation for both the teams and promoters, each of the 19 franchise teams are allowed to miss up to 3 shows during the race season while being guaranteed a minimum starting purse of $1,000 at each event. This system helps to ensure solid, stable car counts and a successful event for the promoter.

ISMA generally sanctions between 13 and 17 shows a year including two of the prestigious supermodified Triple Crown Series at 1/4-5/8 mile paved short tracks located in 6 states and Canada.

Major events on the ISMA schedule include leg one of the supermodified 'Triple Crown' the Hy-Miler Supermodified Nationals, held annually at Sandusky (Ohio) Speedway since 1978, and leg three of the Triple Crown, the Star Classic 150 held at Star Speedway in Epping, NH for over 40 years.  Races are also run at other tracks across the Northeast and Midwest, including Delaware Speedway in Ontario, Canada.

The cars in this series use wings that are designed to move with the airflow over the car, lying almost level with the ground on straightaways creating less aerodynamic drag, and standing up in the turns to increase down force. The only allowable engine with ISMA is a cast iron big block up to 468 cu. in. Aluminum heads are allowed and the cars must weigh a mandatory  post race.

Notable ISMA competitors, past and present, include Russ Wood (eight championships), Chris Perley (six championships), Bentley Warren (four championships), Doug Heveron (four championships), Steve Gioia Jr. (four championships), Pat Abold (three championships), Joe Gosek (two championships) and Mike Ordway Sr. (two championships).  Canadian champions include Dave McKnight Jr. (2001) and Mike Lichty (2012 & 2019).  As of the end of the 2020 season, the top five drivers for all-time ISMA feature wins are Chris Perley (74), Russ Wood (54), Bentley Warren (45), Mike Ordway Sr. (36) and Joe Gosek (30).

MSS
Established in 2001, the Sandusky, Ohio-based Midwest Supermodified Series (MSS; formerly the Midwest Supermodified Association - MSA) runs primarily in Ohio.  MSS drivers frequently take part in ISMA races and vice versa.  Notable MSS champions include Tim Jedrzejek (2002, 2003, 2004, 2008 and 2009), Trent Stephens (2011, 2012, 2013 and 2014) and Dave Shullick Jr. (2005, 2006 and 2007). Dave Shullick Jr. has also won two ISMA championships (2015 and 2016) and one Oswego Speedway championship (2017).

SMRA
The Super Modified Racing Association (SMRA) governed supermodified racing in the Western United States during 2008–2011.  The SMRA grew from the defunct Western States Supermodified Racing League (WSSRL), which ran one season in 2007 at tracks in Arizona, California, Idaho, Utah and Washington before disbanding.  Of these tracks, only Rocky Mountain Raceway in Utah and Madera Speedway in California have returned, with a third track, Magic Valley Speedway in Idaho, made up the 2008 SMRA schedule.

The SMRA had a much more liberal rulebook than its eastern counterparts, with less restrictions on engine placement (rear-engine cars were universally banned in the 1980s) and allowing other such advancements as independent suspension.

The SMRA ceased operations in early 2011 and no sanctioning currently exists in California. Nearly half the races scheduled for 2011 were cancelled due to a shortage of entries.

ERA
The oldest of the four sanctioning bodies for supermodified racing is the Colorado-only Englewood Racing Association, which was formed in 1965 at Englewood Speedway.  That track closed in 1979 and following its closure the series ran a 9-race schedule, all of which were run at Colorado National Speedway (CNS) in Dacono, Colorado until Sunday, May 29, 2016.

A tech inspection for the May 29th 2016 race revealed one car in the Supermodified class had an incorrect muffler installed on the car.  This did not offer a competitive advantage and the car was allowed to run on that day but a correct muffler would have to be installed if the car wanted to compete on a future race date.  "Representatives from the ERA SM club disagreed with the CNS decision, and stated in an ultimatum that if the non-conforming car was allowed to compete, the club would pack up and leave for the evening.  Based upon these hostilities, CNS Officials responded that if the club chose not to compete on the 29th, it would not be welcome back at the track for the remainder of the 2016 racing season. After a number of the ERA SM club members loaded and left the track in protest, CNS determined that such behavior was detrimental to the sport and spirit of competition, and therefore decided to remove the SM Division from the 2016 racing schedule." Following this disagreement in 2016 there has been very few Supermodified races at CNS.

The ERA Supermodifieds now primarily race at I-25 Speedway an asphalt 1/4 mile high banked oval in Pueblo, CO.  Some  of the regular Colorado Supermodified ERA drivers have raced their cars at the Meridian Speedway in Meridian Idaho in non ERA sanctioned races.

References

External links
International Supermodified Association (ISMA)
Midwest Supermodified Association (MSA)
Supermodified Racing Association (SMRA)
Englewood Racing Association
Supermodified Scorecard, a supermodified fansite

Auto racing by type
Open wheel racing